Derek Lee (born September 26, 1981) is an American football wide receiver who is currently a free agent. He played college football at Tennessee Tech.

Lee has also played for the Georgia Force, Columbus Destroyers and Dallas Vigilantes.

External links
Columbus Destroyers bio

1981 births
Living people
American football wide receivers
American football cornerbacks
American football safeties
Tennessee Tech Golden Eagles football players
Georgia Force players
Columbus Destroyers players
Players of American football from Georgia (U.S. state)
Sportspeople from College Park, Georgia
Dallas Vigilantes players
Chicago Rush players
San Antonio Talons players
New Orleans VooDoo players